The Cariboo Gold Rush was a gold rush in the Colony of British Columbia, which later became the Canadian province of British Columbia. The first gold discovery was made at Hills Bar in 1858, followed by more strikes in 1859 on the Horsefly River, and on Keithley Creek and Antler Creek in 1860. The actual rush did not begin until 1861, when these discoveries were widely publicized. By 1865, following the strikes along Williams Creek, the rush was in full swing.

Towns grew up, the most famous of these being Barkerville, now preserved as a heritage site and tourist attraction. Other important towns of the Cariboo gold rush era were Keithley Creek, Quesnel Forks or simply "the Forks", Antler, Richfield, Quesnellemouthe (which would later be shortened to Quesnel), Horsefly and, around the site of the Hudson's Bay Company's fort of the same name, Alexandria.

Williams Creek

Richfield
Richfield was the first strike on Williams Creek, and became the seat of government in the region, particularly of the courts.  Connected to Barkerville via the canyon of Williams Creek, Richfield became part of "Greater Barkerville" along with Cameron Town.

Differences between the Cariboo and Fraser Canyon Rushes

The Cariboo Gold Rush is the most famous of the gold rushes in British Columbia, so much so that it is sometimes erroneously cited as the reason for the creation of the Colony of British Columbia. The Colony's creation had been prompted by an influx of American prospectors to the Fraser Canyon Gold Rush three years earlier in 1858, which had its locus in the area from Lillooet to Yale.

Unlike its southern counterpart, the population of the Cariboo Gold Rush was largely British and Canadian, among them 4000 were Chinese,  although the first wave of the rush was largely American.  By the time the Cariboo rush broke out there was more active interest in the Gold Colony (as British Columbia was often referred to) in the United Kingdom and Canada and there had also been time required for more British and Canadians to get there. The electorate of the Cariboo riding were among the most pro-Confederation in the colony, and this was in no small part because of the strong Canadian element in the local populace.

One reason the Cariboo rush attracted fewer Americans than the original Fraser rush may have been the American Civil War, with many who had been around after the Fraser Gold Rush going home to take sides, or to the Fort Colville Gold Rush which was largely manned by men who had been on the Fraser or to other BC rushes such as those at Rock Creek and Big Bend.

While some of the population that came for the Cariboo rush stayed on as permanent settlers, taking up land in various parts of the Interior in the 1860s and after, that wasn't the general rule for those involved in the Fraser rush. Many veterans of the Cariboo would spread out to explore the rest of the province, in particular triggering the Omineca and Cassiar Gold Rushes, just as the Cariboo itself had been found by miners seeking out in search of new finds from the Fraser rush.

The Cariboo Wagon Road

The boom in the Cariboo goldfields was the impetus for the construction of the Cariboo Wagon Road by the Royal Engineers, which bypassed the older routes via the Fraser Canyon and the Lakes Route (Douglas Road) via Lillooet by using the canyon of the Thompson River to Ashcroft and from there via the valley of the Bonaparte River to join the older route from Lillooet at Clinton.

Towns along the Cariboo Road include Clinton, 100 Mile House and Williams Lake, although most had their beginnings before the Cariboo rush began. During the rush, the  largest and most important town lay at the road's end at Barkerville, which had grown up around the most profitable and famous of the many Cariboo mining camps. 

The Cariboo Wagon Road was an immense infrastructure burden for the colony but needed to be built to enable access and bring governmental authority to the Cariboo goldfields, which was necessary in order to maintain and assert control of the wealth, which might more easily have passed through the Interior to the United States. 
   
The wagon road's most important freight was the Gold Escort, which brought government bullion to Yale for shipment to the colonial treasury.  Despite the wealth of the Cariboo goldfields, the expense of colonizing the Cariboo contributed to the Mainland Colony's virtual bankruptcy and its forced union with the Island Colony, and similarly into Confederation.

In literature 
A 1976 young adult novel, Cariboo Runaway, by Sandy Frances Duncan, is set in the Cariboo area during the Cariboo Gold Rush.

See also 

 Cariboo camels
 Hudson's Bay Brigade Trail
 Old Cariboo Road
 Omineca Gold Rush
 River Trail

References

External links
 Map of the Cariboo Gold Rush

Further reading
 Gold In Cariboo chapter, A History of British Columbia, R. Gosnell & E.O.S. Scholefield, British Columbia Historical Association (Vancouver 1913) pp. 165-178

British Columbia gold rushes
Cariboo
History of British Columbia
1861 in the British Empire